Andrea Parodi (Porto Torres, 18 July 1955 – Quartu Sant'Elena, 17 October 2006) was an Italian singer from Sardinia. He is known for his vocals with several groups, including Coro degli Angeli from 1978 to 1987, and Tazenda from 1988 to 1997 and again 2005–2006, as well as his solo career.

His work, including that with Tazenda, blended folk roots of Sardinia with rock and Italian pop, bringing international attention to the island's culture, including the Sardinian language. He worked extensively with various international artists.

He was director for a video about Tazenda and some documentaries on Sardinia, and was producer for other artists, such as fellow Sardinian, Marino de Rosas.

He died from cancer, before fully completing planned work on the album, Rosa Resolza, with Elena Ledda, which was released in 2007.

A museum exhibit was established in 2010. In 2015, the Sardinian town of Nulvi dedicated a new park to him. His legacy also endures in the Premio Andrea Parodi, an annual prize for World Music.

Discography

Albums 
With Coro degli Angeli
Studio albums
 1982 – Canzoni di Mogol – Battisti
 1984 – Misterios
 1986 – Shangay  
Live albums
 1980 – Cantare – Gianni Morandi
 1983 – Live @ RTSI Gianni Morandi
 1997 – Coro degli Angeli Live Concert 1984/87

With Tazenda
Studio albums
 1988 – Tazenda
 1991 – Murales
 1992 – Limba
 1995 – Fortza paris
Live albums
 1993 – Il popolo rock
 2005 – Tazenda
Compilations
 1997 – Il sole di Tazenda

Solo
 2002 – Abacada (Storie di note, AV 01)
 2004 – Andrea Parodi
 2005 – Midsummer Night in Sardinia, with Al Di Meola
 2006 – Intimi Raccolti
 2007 – Rosa Resolza, with Elena Ledda

Participant
 1993 – Soft Songs
 2005 – Indaco - Porte d'oriente

References

External links 
 Fondazione Andrea Parodi 
 Ave Maria – Andrea Parodi and Coro degli angeli 
 Non potho reposare – Tazenda and Andrea Parodi  
 Domo Mia (Dj-EviL Remix) – Tazenda and Eros Ramazzotti 

1955 births
Music in Sardinia
2006 deaths
20th-century Italian male  singers